Nevada's 18th Senate district is one of 21 districts in the Nevada Senate. It has been represented by Republican Scott Hammond since 2012.

Geography
District 18 covers the northwestern edge of the Las Vegas Valley in Clark County, including parts of Summerlin and Las Vegas proper.

The district is located entirely within Nevada's 4th congressional district, and overlaps with the 4th and 13th districts of the Nevada Assembly.

Recent election results
Nevada Senators are elected to staggered four-year terms; since 2012 redistricting, the 18th district has held elections in presidential years.

2020

2016

2012

Federal and statewide results in District 18

References 

18
Clark County, Nevada